The Outsiders is a coming-of-age novel by S.E. Hinton, first published in 1967 by Viking Press. Hinton was only 15 when she started writing the novel; however, she did most of the work when she was 16 and a junior in high school. Hinton was 18 when the book was published. The book details the conflict between two rival gangs divided by their socioeconomic status: the working-class "greasers" and the upper-class "Socs" (pronounced —short for Socials). The story is told in first-person perspective by teenage protagonist Ponyboy Curtis.

The story in the book takes place in Tulsa, Oklahoma, in 1965, but this is never explicitly stated in the book.

A film adaptation was produced in 1983 by Francis Ford Coppola, and a short-lived television series appeared in 1990, picking up where the movie left off. A dramatic stage adaptation was written by Christopher Sergel and published in 1990. A stage musical adaptation with a libretto by Adam Rapp and songs by Jamestown Revival is currently in the works as of 2022.

Plot summary

Ponyboy Curtis, a fourteen year old boy who is a member of a "gang of "greasers", is leaving a movie theater when he is jumped by "Socs", the greasers' rival gang. Several greasers, including Ponyboy's two older brothers—the paternal Darry and the popular Sodapop—come to his rescue. The next night, Ponyboy and two greaser friends, the hardened Dally and the quiet Johnny, meet Cherry and Marcia, a pair of Soc girls, at a drive-in movie theater. Cherry scorns Dally's rude advances, but Ponyboy speaks civilly with Cherry, emotionally connecting with a Soc for the first time in his life.

Afterward, Ponyboy, Johnny, and their wisecracking friend Two-Bit begin to walk Cherry and Marcia home, when they are stopped by Cherry's boyfriend Bob, who badly beat up Johnny a few months back. Bob and the greasers exchange taunts, but Cherry prevents a fight by willingly leaving with Bob. Ponyboy gets home at two in the morning, enraging Darry until he suddenly slaps Ponyboy. Pony runs out the door and meets up with Johnny, expressing his anger at Darry's increasing coldness in the wake of his parents' recent deaths in a car crash.

Running away from home, Ponyboy and Johnny wander into a park, where Bob and four other Socs surround them. After some heated talk, Ponyboy spits at the Socs, prompting them to attempt to drown him in a nearby fountain, but Johnny stabs Bob, killing him and dispersing the rest. Terrified as to what to do next, Ponyboy and Johnny rush to find Dally, who gives them money and a loaded gun, directing them to hide in an abandoned church in Windrixville. During their stay there, Pony cuts and dyes his hair as a disguise, reads Gone with the Wind to Johnny, and, upon viewing a beautiful sunrise, recites the poem "Nothing Gold Can Stay" by Robert Frost.

Days later, Dally comes to check on them, revealing that violence between the greasers and Socs has escalated since Bob's death into all-out city-wide warfare, with Cherry acting out of guilt as a spy for the greasers. Johnny decides to turn himself in and Dally agrees to take the boys back home. As they attempt to leave, they notice the church has caught fire and several local schoolchildren have become trapped inside. The greasers run inside the burning church to save the children, but Ponyboy is rendered unconscious by the fumes. At the hospital he discovers that he and Dally are not badly injured, but a piece of the church roof fell on Johnny and broke his back. Sodapop and Darry come to the hospital; Darry breaks down and cries. Ponyboy then realizes that Darry cares about him, and is only hard on him because he loves him and cares about his future.

The following morning the newspapers declare Pony and Johnny heroes, but Johnny will be charged with manslaughter for Bob's death. Two-Bit tells them that the greaser–Soc rivalry is to be settled in a final rumble. Ponyboy and Two-Bit are approached by a Soc named Randy, Bob's best friend, who expresses remorse for his involvement in the gang war, lacks confidence about the rumble ending the feud, and says he will not participate.

Later, Ponyboy visits Johnny at the hospital, where he is in critical condition. On their way home, Pony spots Cherry and they talk. Cherry says she is unwilling to visit Johnny in the hospital because he killed her boyfriend. Pony calls her a traitor, but after she explains herself they end on good terms. After escaping the hospital, Dally shows up just in time for the rumble. The greasers win the brutal fight. Afterward, Pony and Dally hurry back to the hospital to see Johnny, but he dies moments later and a maniacal Dally runs out of the room. Pony returns home that night feeling confused and disoriented. Dally calls the house to say that he has robbed a store and is running from the police. The greasers find Dally deliberately pointing an unloaded gun at the police, causing them to shoot and kill him. Overwhelmed, Ponyboy faints and is sick in bed for many days due to the resulting concussion from the rumble. When the hearing finally comes, the judge frees Ponyboy from responsibility for Bob's death and allows Pony to remain at home with Darry and Soda.

Ponyboy returns to school, but his grades drop. Although he is failing English, his teacher, Mr. Syme, says he will pass him if he writes a decent theme. In the copy of Gone with the Wind that Johnny gave him before dying, Ponyboy finds a letter from Johnny describing how he will die proudly after saving the kids from the fire. Johnny also urges Ponyboy to "stay gold". Ponyboy decides to write his English assignment about the recent events, and begins his essay with the opening line of the novel: "When I stepped out into the bright sunlight from the darkness of the movie house, I had only two things on my mind: Paul Newman and a ride home..."

Major characters

Greasers
Ponyboy Curtis: The narrator and the youngest Curtis brother, Ponyboy is 14 years old, and gets good grades and runs track. He's the most sensitive of the greasers (besides Johnny), and enjoys reading books.
Sodapop "Soda" Curtis: The middle Curtis brother, 16 years old, a popular high school dropout who works at a gas station. He's often described as being attractive and comedic, the reason for his popularity.
Darrel "Darry" Curtis: The oldest Curtis brother, 20 years old, who has been caring for his brothers since their parents died in a car crash. He is the unofficial leader of the gang.
Johnny Cade: Ponyboy's best friend. 16 years old, who is extremely quiet and lives with his alcoholic, neglectful, and abusive parents
Dallas "Dally" Winston: A 17-year-old juvenile delinquent, he is the roughest and most volatile of the greasers, but cares more about Johnny than he does anyone else. He lived on the streets of New York City for three years. Carries an unloaded gun.
Keith "Two-Bit" Mathews: A wise-cracking kleptomaniac.
Steve Randle: Sodapop's best friend since grade school.
Timothy "Tim" Shepard: Leader of another greaser gang: an organized downtown one. He is also a friend of Dally's.
Curly Shepard: Tim Shepard's younger brother, mentioned as a friend of Ponyboy's.
Sandy: Sodapop's disloyal girlfriend, who eventually leaves him.

Socs
 Sherri "Cherry" Valance: Attends the same high school as Ponyboy. Bob's girlfriend. 
 Robert "Bob" Sheldon: Considered the leader of the Socs. Cherry's boyfriend who is stabbed and killed by Johnny.
 Randy Adderson: Bob's best friend and Marcia's boyfriend.
 Marcia: Cherry's best friend and Randy's girlfriend. 
Paul Holden: Darry's old friend from high school.
 David: A member of the Socs who tries to drown Ponyboy in the fountain.

Other characters
 Jerry Wood: The schoolteacher responsible for the children who were in the seemingly abandoned church.
 Mr. Syme: Ponyboy's English teacher who assigns him a theme to write that becomes the story of the novel itself.

Controversy
The Outsiders was a controversial book at the time of its publication; it is still currently challenged and debated. It was ranked #38 on the American Library Association’s Top 100 Most Frequently Challenged Books of 1990–1999. This book has been banned from some schools and libraries because of the portrayal of gang violence, underage smoking and drinking, strong language/slang, and family dysfunction. However, in many U.S. schools, the book is part of the English curriculum at the middle- or high-school level.

Critical reception
On November 5, 2019, the BBC News listed The Outsiders on its list of the 100 most influential novels.

Aftermath, film adaptation, museum and popular culture

In Hinton later novels 
Ponyboy Curtis appears in Hinton's later novel That Was Then, This Is Now (1971).

Film adaption 
The 1983 film adaptation was directed by Francis Ford Coppola, since its release it retains a fanbase. The film is notable for casting young actors before their rise to fame, which includes C. Thomas Howell, Ralph Macchio, Matt Dillon, Patrick Swayze, Rob Lowe, Emilio Estevez, Tom Cruise, and Diane Lane.

Sequel TV series 
A television series based on the characters of the novel and film aired in 1990. It consists of a different cast playing the same characters. It picks up right after the events of the film's ending and lasted only one season.

Video-game 
In Rockstar Vancouver/Rockstar Games' 2006 video game Bully, two factions, The Greasers and the Preppies/Preps, who both have major roles in the game, are based on The Outsiders’ Greaser and Socs factions respectively. On occasion, while starting a fight with a Greaser, he may say "Heads up, Ponyboy".

The Outsiders House Museum and local preservations of the film locations 
The Outsiders House Museum opened in Tulsa, Oklahoma, on August 9th, 2019. In 2009, hip-hop artist Danny Boy O'Connor discovered the house that was used  for the Curtis Brothers's home. Moving forward O'Connor kept the thought of buying it, which he eventually did in 2016. O'Connor said he bought it sight unseen and when he first went inside that it was falling apart. With the help of friends, the Oklahoma Film and Music Office, the City Council, local business and individuals who volunteered the restoration started. After raising funds the house went through extensive renovations to restore it and maintain its authenticity from the film. A GoFundMe was set up for additional funds, notable donors include Jack White who donated $30,000 and Billy Idol. Also to raise funds, screenings of the film were organized that actor C. Thomas Howell attended. Also in 2016, the street signs on the corner were changed to "The Outsiders way" and "The Curtis Brothers Lane". Since its opening, the museum now contains a collection of The Outsiders memorabilia. Aside from Howell, between its restoration and opening, other stars of the films visited this includes Rob Lowe, Ralph Macchio, and Matt Dillon. For his efforts on preserving a cultural landmark O'Connor received a key to the city of Tulsa.

In 2022, in Sperry, Oklahoma, the group Upward Sperry restored the now un-operational DX gas station seen in the film. The group's president Gary Coulson said, “It’s really growing. I almost hate to say, but it’s almost like a cult following. They stream through here - what that does is get people here.” With O'Connor they are planning to revitalize Outsiders nostalgia in Sperry.

Stage musical adaptation 
A stage musical based on both the novel and film has been in the works as of 2022 and is expected to hold its world premiere at La Jolla Playhouse in February/March 2023. The production will be directed by Danya Taymor from a libretto by Adam Rapp, with songs by Jamestown Revival and music supervision, arrangements, and orchestrations by Justin Levine.

References

Bibliography

External links
 S.E. Hinton's Website
The Enduring Fascination of S.E. Hinton's The Outsiders, Pacific Standard, April 26, 2017.
 "‘The Outsiders’: 40 Years Later"  By Dale Peck The New York Times September 23, 2007

1967 American novels
1967 debut novels
American bildungsromans
American novels adapted into films
American novels adapted into plays
American young adult novels
Fiction set in 1965
Culture of Tulsa, Oklahoma
BILBY Award-winning works
Viking Press books
Novels set in Tulsa, Oklahoma
First-person narrative novels